John Keane may refer to:

Sports
 John Keane (hurler) (1917–1975), Irish sportsman
 Jack Keane (hurler) (1892–1978), Irish hurler for the Limerick senior team
 John Keane (Gaelic footballer) (born 1980), Gaelic football player for Westmeath GAA
 Johnny Keane (1911–1967), American baseball player
 Jack Keane (footballer) (1911–2005), Australian rules footballer
 J. J. Keane (John James Keane, 1871–1956), Irish Gaelic footballer and Olympic official

Politicians
 John F. Keane, U.S. Ambassador to Paraguay, 2003–2005
 John J. Keane (politician), Irish Fianna Fáil politician from Galway
 John Thomas Keane (died 1946), Irish politician
 Sir John Keane, 5th Baronet (1873–1956), member of the first Irish government's Senate and a director of the Bank of Ireland
 Sir John Keane, 1st Baronet (1757–1829), MP for Youghal

Musicians
 John E. Keane (born 1952), British film and television composer
 John M. Keane (musician) (born 1965), American songwriter and musician who used to be a member of a pop musical group the Keane Brothers
 John Keane (record producer), music producer and founder of the John Keane recording studio

Military
 John Keane, 1st Baron Keane (1781–1844), Major General
 Jack Keane (John Keane, born 1943), former Vice Chief of Staff of the US Army

Others
 John Fryer Thomas Keane (1854–1937), British adventurer
 John J. Keane (bishop) (1839–1918), Catholic archbishop of Dubuque, Iowa
 John Keane (artist) (born 1954), British artist
 John Keane (political theorist) (born 1949), Australian-born British political theorist
 John B. Keane (1928–2002), Irish playwright, novelist and essayist 
 John B. Keane (architect) (died 1859), Irish architect
 John G. Keane, American business executive and director of the United States Census Bureau 
 Jack Keane (video game), a 2007 video game by Deck13 Interactive

See also
 John Kean (disambiguation)
 John Keen (disambiguation)
 John Keene (disambiguation)
 John Kene, MP for Newcastle-under-Lyme